Oriental Heroes is a popular Hong Kong-based manhua created by Wong Yuk-long, a writer/artist responsible for also creating a number of other popular manhua titles.  It was created in 1970, and it continues to be published today.  The book was the first Hong Kong manhua title based on action and fighting, often borrowing from the wuxia literary world.  It established a new action genre of Hong Kong manhua and spawned many imitators.  The theme of its stories often revolve around brotherhood and the fight for justice.  The 2006 movie Dragon Tiger Gate was based on this manhua.

Name
Oriental Heroes is the book's official English name. Its Chinese name is pronounced in Cantonese, Lùhng Fú Mùhn.  This name translates as "Dragon Tiger Gate" in English, and is in reference to the name of the fictional kungfu school and organization that is a major subject matter in the book.

History
Oriental Heroes was first published in 1970 under the title Little Rascals.  It featured stories about young people living in public housing estates in Hong Kong fighting gangsters and criminals.  The heroes of the stories exhibited antisocial behaviours, but routinely fought for justice.  In the early years of the book's run, the fighting was very graphically illustrated.  Various weapons were used, where spilled blood, internal organs, guts, and bones were shown in the injuries that the characters sustained.  People criticised the graphic violence depicted in Oriental Heroes and other similar action genre manhua, eventually leading to the enactment of the Indecent Publication Law in 1975, banning explicit violence in manhua.

As the Indecent Publication Law only applied to manhua, Wong Yuk-long established a daily newspaper, called Sàng Bou, with which to publish Oriental Heroes.  In the first month of Sàng Bou's run, the newspaper published actual news together with various manhua titles, including Oriental Heroes on the back cover.  After a month, Sàng Bou switched to a manhua-only daily newspaper. Oriental Heroes was published daily in the newspaper, and a full week's stories were collected and published in book form every week.  Wong Yuk-long changed the name of the book to its current name of Lùhng Fú Mùhn, with the English name of Oriental Heroes.  He also explored less graphic means of depicting violence and altered his drawing technique.

Responding to the success of writer Ma Wing Shing's manhua, Chinese Hero, Wong Yuk-long modified Oriental Heroes again in the mid-1980s.  The drawing style began to use a style described by Tim Pilcher and Brad Brooks in their 2005 book The Essential Guide to World Comics as "more realistic," and the stories became more serious and less comical.  After 1991, Oriental Heroes started being drawn by other artists instead of Wong Yuk-long himself.

Main characters
The stories in Oriental Heroes mostly center around three main characters who are leaders of the kung-fu organization and school, Dragon Tiger Gate.

Wang Xiao Hu
Eighteen years old and with a strong sense of justice, Wang Xiao Hu (  Wáng Xiǎo Hǔ ) fights to protect the weak from those who would oppress them.  He is both calm and courageous, fighting against powerful and evil forces without any fear.  Being from a family of martial artists, he is a naturally talented fighter.  His signature technique is the Wang Family's 18 Dragon Slayer Kicks, invented by his grandfather. Besides his family kung fu, he also invented a kicking technique named Leuih Dihn Sahn Teui; the name of this technique translates to "Thunder and Lightning Kick".  Wang xiao hu's name means "Little Tiger". Since his father was Wong Fuk Fu, the more appropriate translation would be "Tiger Wong Jr". In English translations he is called "Tiger Wong".

At first, he only mastered Taming The Tiger Fist (Gong Zi Fu Hu Quan) and Tiger Crane Paired Form Fist (Hu He Shuang Xing Quan), both of which are his family kung fu. Later on, after meeting his eldest uncle, Wang Jiang Long, he was able to learn the legendary Wang Family's 18 Dragonslayer Kicks. As the story progresses, his kung fu skills are also developing, either by improving his current technique or learning an entire new skill.
Subsequently, he learns "Nine Suns" Chi kung. This dramatically raises the power of his moves.

Wang Xiao Long
Wong xiao long ( Wáng Xiǎo Lóng) is twenty years old and is the elder half-brother of Wang Xiao-hu by the same father.  Sentimental and a loner, he values righteousness but is an indecisive person. When he was little, his mother left his father after finding out that he secretly had married another woman, Wang Xiao-hu's mother. The heartache she suffered had caused her to die miserably, which caused him to be raised in the orphanage. Lacking proper care, he turned into a rascal, eventually becomes a gang member. As a gang member he even fought Wong Xiao-hu once, before they realized they were brothers. Although he was finally reformed and had a good relationship with his brother, Wang Xiao-long still unable to forgive Wong Xiao-hu's parents, whom he felt responsible for his mother's sufferings and miserable death. Wang Xiao-long's name means "Little Dragon". In English translations he is called "Wong Siu Long" or "Dragon Wong".

Even though he came from a family of martial artists he didn't learn the family kung fu because he was taken away by his mother at a very young age. Instead, he learned Eight Trigrams Palm (Bagua Zhang) and staff style at the beginning of the story. After he's reunited with his brother and uncle he also learned the Wong Family's 18 Dragonslayer Kicks. However, he modified the style and using his hands-instead of his feet-to perform them. Later on he had a fateful encounter with the current leader of the Beggar Clan and was able to learn the original 18 Dragonslayer Palms and the Dog-Beating Stick Technique, greatly increasing his fighting skills.

In later edition, Wang Xiao-long is killed by Chan Ou Wan, the lieutenant of Fiery God.

Shi Hei Long
Eighteen-year-old Shi Hei Long ( Shi Hei Long) is of mixed Chinese and Russian descent.  Together with his parents and his younger sister, his family of four lived in Macau. His father, being a Judo master, attracted the attention of the evil organisation, Seui Gwat Muhn. Seui Gwat Muhn's leader invited Shi Hei Long's father to join his organization, but Shi Hei Long's father refused.  The two fought, and Shi Hei Long's father mysteriously disappeared after the fight.  Shi Hei Long's mother then led her family to find refuge in Cheung Chau, under the protection of master Gam Mouh Si Wong. Shi Hei long usually fights using his nunchucks.  His name means "Dark Dragon" or "Black Dragon". However, due to his blonde hair, in English translations he is called "Gold Dragon". In Malaysia translations he is called "Dragon Long". There are other names for Shi Hei Long such as Turbo Shek, Shek Hak Luhng, Shi Hei Long, Dragon Shek and Rock Black Dragon.

In addition to be a formidable judoka, Shi Hei Long was also very good at playing nunchakus, two skills  he mastered at the beginning of the story. Later on he got the chance the learn the legendary Shaolin Golden Bell Armor skill which greatly improved his power and endurance. As with other characters of the story his skills are also increasing throughout the story.

See also
Hong Kong Comics: A History of Manhua

References

Hong Kong comics titles
Martial arts comics
1970 comics debuts